Woodbury Lakes is an outdoor shopping center in Woodbury, Minnesota. The mall was constructed in 2005 branded as a "lifestyle center". The mall is located east of the intersection of I-94 and I-494/I-694. The mall contains around 55 retail tenants.

Woodbury Lakes is owned by Ramco-Gershenson Properties Trust (headquartered in Farmington Hills, Michigan), who acquired it in 2014 for approximately $150 million.

Stores 
Stores as of December 2016 include:
 Aèropostale
 Banana Republic
 Chico’s
 The Children’s Place
 DSW
 Eddie Bauer
 Gap
 Gap Kids
 H&M
 Kirkland’s
 Trader Joe’s
 Victoria’s Secret

References 

Shopping malls established in 2005
Shopping malls in Minnesota